The World Allergy Organization (WAO) is an international umbrella organization of 109 regional and national allergology and clinical immunology societies that cooperate across 27 committees. Since the first World Allergy Congress (WAC) held in Zurich, Switzerland in 1951, there have been 37 WACs, WAO International Science Conferences (WISC), and symposia. Beyond sharing research findings, these meetings also allocate funds for postgraduate programs on allergy and clinical immunology.

History 
After the International Association of Allergology and Clinical Immunology (renamed as World Allergy Organization) was founded at the 1951 International Congress of Allergology and Clinical Immunology (renamed as World Allergy Congress), these major conferences were held triennially until the 2003 switch to a biennial format.

Publications 
The WAO publishes monthly issues of the open-access World Allergy Organization Journal with Alessandro Fiocchi and Erika Jensen-Jarolim serving as co-editors. The articles are divided across "Environment and Allergy," "Drug Allergy and Hypersensitivity," "Food Allergy," "Diagnostics in Allergy," and "Allergen Immunotherapy" sections. WAO organizes an annual World Allergy Week from June 5-11th with the 2022 theme of "the asthma and allergy connection" focusing public attention on common asthma irritants, symptoms, and prevention methods.

Partnerships 
WAO is a member of the Council for International Organizations of Medical Science (CIOMS). Its collaborations with the World Health Organization (WHO) include a January 2002 meeting on the "Prevention of Allergy and Allergic Asthma" held in Geneva, Switzerland that emphasized minimizing air pollution and teaching patients to carry epinephrine autoinjectors.

See also 
 Ruby Umesh Pawankar

References

External links
 

International medical and health organizations
Allergy organizations
International organizations based in the United States